Broadcast Alchemy was a radio broadcasting company that merged with Booth American Company in April 1994 to form Secret Communications LP.

Defunct radio broadcasting companies of the United States